2023
March 10, Joe Bonamassa
February 26, Frankie Valli and the Four Seasons
February 23, Al Stewart, America
January 22, Styx

2022
June 16, Robby Krieger of the Doors

2021
June 4, Hot Tuna

2020
March 12, Steve Tyrell at the Studio Theatre
January 21, Indigo Girls, opening act was Kristy Lee
January 17, David Bromberg Quintet at the Studio Theatre, opening act was Brad Ray
January 3, Donna the Buffalo at the Studio Theatre

2019
April 27, Craig Chaquico at the Studio Theatre
February 16, Alan Parsons Project
January 17, Pablo Cruise

2018
October 28, Lindsey Buckingham, opening act was J.S. Ondara
February 28, Jorma Kaukonen at the Studio Theatre

2017
July 21, Ace Frehley, opening act was local band Vibe
June 30, Al Stewart, Ambrosia and Firefall
April 15, Dick Dale, opening act was Stephen Cotta at the Studio Theatre
March 19, The Charlie Daniels Band, opening act was the Scooter Brown Band

2016
July 21, Ted Nugent, opening act was The Raskins
June 11, KC and the Sunshine Band, Blue Öyster Cult, Orleans
May 19, The Monkees
March 18, George Thorogood and the Destroyers, opening act was the Outlaws
March 3, Herb Alpert & Lani Hall
February 13, Dave Mason
January 24, Arlo Guthrie, opening act was the Sarah Lee Guthrie

2015
November 12, Yes
November 11, America
October 30, Kansas
August 19, John Hiatt and Taj Mahal
August 8, Jorma Kaukonen at the Studio Theatre
May 15, John Mayall
May 6, Boston
April 23, Celtic Woman
February 14, Gordon Lightfoot
January 14, Foreigner

2014
December 10, Hall & Oates
November 12, Heart
October 22, Ringo Starr & His All-Starr Band
March 28, The Moody Blues
February 16, The Beach Boys
January 2, Gregg Allman, opening act was the Devon Allman Band

2013
October 18, Chicago
April 29, The Smashing Pumpkins
March 30, Yes

2012
August 30, Creed

2011
October 7, The Steve Miller Band
May 13, Kris Kristofferson and John Prine
March 20, Crystal Gayle, Larry Gatlin and Andy Cooney (American Voices tour)

2010
November 19, Diana Ross
November 17, Fiddler on the Roof
April 30, ZZ Top
April 2, Jerry Seinfeld
March 20, Foreigner
February 4, Buddy Guy and B.B. King
January 23, South Pacific

2007
December 29, ZZ Top, opening act was Blackberry Smoke
November 7, Morrissey
April 6, Tom Jones

2006
July 15, Spyro Gyra
July 9, Ringo Starr & His All-Starr Band
March 25, The Sleeping Beauty
March 10, James Taylor
February 2, Soweto Gospel Choir
January 29, Earl Klugh
January 27, Vince Gill
January 15, Linda Ronstadt

2005
November 2, Billy Idol
October 20, Trisha Yearwood, opening act was Jessi Alexander
September 28, Loggins and Messina (Sittin' In Again tour)
April 15, Ravi Shankar with Anoushka Shankar and Tanmoy Bose
April 13, Joe Jackson and Todd Rundgren, opening act was Ethel
April 8, Mannheim Steamroller
March 3, Patti LaBelle

2003
November 16, Peter Cetera
October 26,  Wynonna, opening act was Blue Country
October 19, Boz Scaggs
October 10, Peter Frampton, opening act was Joe Bonamassa
January 7, Huey Lewis and the News

2002
December 18, The Oak Ridge Boys
November 24, The Irish Tenors
October 26, Wynonna
October 20, Michael Bolton
October 3, Lee Ann Womack, opening act was Elizabeth Cook
May 10, Jethro Tull
March 20, Englebert Humperdinck
March 10, Natalie Merchant
March 15, KC and the Sunshine Band and Village People
February 22, Sérgio Mendes and Dionne Warwick
January 4, Hall & Oates (postponed from 13 September 2001)

2001
November 23, Anne Murray with full symphony orchestra
September 9, Olivia Newton-John
April 24, Bruce Hornsby
March 21, The Irish Rovers
February 11, Smokey Robinson
January 14, Kenny Rogers, opening act was Linda Davis

2000
October 29, Julio Iglesias
October 26, Natalie Cole
June 2, Wynonna, opening act was Michael Johnson
February 18, Stomp
January 23, Tony Orlando with Johnny Petillo

1999
November 21, Chicago
November 20, Ray Charles
November 8, The Righteous Brothers
November 5, Alabama
July 16, Ann and Nancy Wilson (acoustic)
March 16, Kodo

1998
October 23, Willie Nelson and Family, opening act was Bob Rafkin
October 22, Peter, Paul and Mary
March 20, The Scots Guards and The Black Watch
March 13, Guitar Summit III: Herb Ellis, Sharon Isbin, Rory Block and Stanley Jordan
February 13, Wayne Newton
February 12, Bobby Vinton
February 3, B.B. King
February 1, Pat Metheny Group
January 11, George Winston
January 2, James Brown with backup singers The Bitter Sweets

1997
December 27, The Manhattan Transfer
November 28, Colors of Christmas: Sheena Easton, Peabo Bryson, James Ingram, Patti Austin
November 13, Dr. John and his Band joined by Charlie Musselwhite and Keb' Mo' for a few songs
October 23, Dion and Little Richard
October 19, Al Di Meola and The Rippingtons with Russ Freeman
August 10, Boz Scaggs, opening act was Delgado
February 22, Tibetan Monks
February 16, Paul Anka, opening act was comedian Stewie Stone

1996
November 23, Jessi Colter and Waylon Jennings, opening act was comedian Dan Riley
November 15, Art Porter, Jr. and George Benson
October 26, America and Air Supply
October 24, The Four Tops
April 4, Grease with Sally Struthers and Mackenzie Phillips
March 23, Gordon Lightfoot
February 8, Blood, Sweat & Tears

1988
April 10, Singin' in the Rain (venue premiere performance)

References
King Center website. "Past Shows"

Events in Florida
Maxwell C. King Center for the Performing Arts
Lists of events by venue
Events